RK Rudar is a Bosnian rugby club based in Zenica.

History
The club was founded in 1982.

External links
RK Rudar

Bosnia and Herzegovina rugby union teams
Rugby clubs established in 1982
Sport in Zenica
1982 establishments in Yugoslavia